The Grand River Valley AVA is an American Viticultural Area (AVA) spread across portions of the Lake,  Geauga and   Ashtabula counties of northeastern Ohio located  east of  Cleveland. The appellation was established on October 20, 1983 by the  Bureau of Alcohol, Tobacco and Firearms (ATF) of the  Department of Treasury and is the largest AVA in the state. The viticultural area lies entirely within the larger, multi-state Lake Erie AVA.

History
The name "Grand River" was assigned by early explorers and settlers to the river called "Sheauga" or "Geauga" by the indigenous natives. This Indian word actually means "raccoon" but was so widely  misinterpreted that the name "Grand River" has applied to the river since the early nineteenth century.  Ohio has a rich heritage as a wine producing state. Its viticultural history dates back to the 1800s, and at the turn of the 20th century there was a thriving wine industry along the shores of the lake making the region as the nation's number one wine producer. Prohibition led to the decimation of the Grand River Valley's vineyards in the 1920s, but the development of cold-hardy hybrids sparked a resurgence of winemaking for the area in the latter half of the 20th Century. Ohio contains the second largest wine appellation of origin in the United States.

Terroir

Geography and Climate
The Grand River Valley was formed when  glaciers carved out the Great Lakes and deposited a ridge of fertile soil ideal for the cultivation of vineyards. Lake Erie has a moderating effect on climates of the Ohio south shore, extending the growing season in Ohio's "fruit belt." Along the Ohio River in southwest Ohio, the climate, soils and geography enabled this region to produce quality domestic wines. 
Like the Mosel, Bordeaux and the Sonoma/Russian River Valley,  the rolling landscape of the Grand River Valley benefits from a climate moderated by the thermal effects of a large water mass, in this case, Lake Erie to the north. It is an added bonus that Erie is the shallowest of the Great Lakes, meaning that it is also the warmest. The lake freezes in the winter and the late spring thaw prevents unseasonal warm spells in late winter and early spring. The lake's protection against spring frost damage and the delay of the first autumn frost defines the growing season.  For commercial viticulture in this region, a growing season of 165 days is considered minimal and 180 days is preferable, and that the winter minimum temperature should infrequently fall below minus  and almost never below minus  depending on the distance inland from the lake shore.  The petition proposal noted,  "Temperature is the first consideration in selecting the location of a vineyard. It involves length of growing season, as well as magnitude and frequency of winter minimums. Temperature requirements must be satisfied for a site to be considered." The growing season micro-climate is characterized as warm, sunny days and cool nights.

Air Drainage
Air drainage is a geographical feature affecting viticulture which is found in any river valley. It is manifested by the tendency of cool air to sink along the surrounding topography and drain to the
surface of the water. This phenomenon draws warmer air closer to the ground and reduces the incidence of frost damage. Air drainage distinguishes the Grand River Valley viticultural area from the Lake Erie viticultural area which surrounds it on all sides except at the inland boundary of the lake's climate influence. The boundary of the Grand River Valley viticultural area is established as any point which is two miles, in any direction, from the river, the approximate point where the air drainage feature is dissipated.

Soil and Rainfall
Over the millennia, strong, slow glaciations sculpted the landscape, exposing some rock types and covering up others. The bedrock is composed of older sedimentary mixed with igneous and metamorphic rocks in the subsurface. The common Ohio soil composition is an irregular veneer of Quaternary-age sediments of gravel, sand, clay and slit pushed up by glaciers during the formation of Lake Erie mixed with a windblown loess. The region offers winemakers a generous hoard of viticultural sites with a southeast aspect, where the vines can soak up the morning sun, and good air drainage further reduces the risk of frost.  Rainfall is higher in the Grand River Valley than in other areas of Ohio, but the region's sand and gravel-based topsoil are free draining and efficiently disperse excess water. Much of the land slopes northeast towards the lake, letting the grapes catch early morning sun, but avoid afternoon heating. The hillsides promote water drainage from the vine’s roots preventing oversaturation which dilutes the concentration of flavor, sugar and other quality attributes in the grapes.

Wine Industry
The ATF petition proposal was the result of a petition submitted by Mr. Anthony P. Debevc, President of Chalet Debonne Vineyards, Inc., a winery located in Madison, Ohio. Vitis vinifera varieties such as Chardonnay, Pinot Gris, Riesling, Pinot Noir, Riesling, Cabernet Sauvignon, Cabernet Franc Syrah and Merlot are joined in the vineyards by Franco-American hybrids such as Chambourcin, Vidal Blanc and Traminette. The recognition of Ohio's wine producing areas benefits the state’s tourism as the Ohio Department of Natural Resources does its part to foster this important resource.

References

External links
 Wine Growers of the Grand River Valley
 Vines & Wines Wine Trail, Ohio Wine Producers Association
  TTB AVA Map

American Viticultural Areas
Geography of Ashtabula County, Ohio
Geography of Geauga County, Ohio
Geography of Lake County, Ohio
Ohio wine
1983 establishments in Ohio